Kinuku (Nu) is a Kainji language of Nigeria.

References

East Kainji languages
Languages of Nigeria